Wallace E. Holland (1926–1998) was an American politician who served as the first African-American mayor of Pontiac, Michigan, the county seat of Oakland County

Biography
Holland was born in 1926. He was elected to the City Council of Pontiac, Michigan and then was named by the council as mayor in 1974. He served until 1978 before joining General Motors as an executive. After the city changed its government to a strong mayor form of government, he won the general election in 1981 beginning his term in 1982. In the 1985 general election, he was defeated by Walter L. Moore before returning the favor and defeating Moore in the 1989 general election. In 1993, he was defeated in the primaries by state representative Charlie Harrison Jr. and former mayor Walter Moore. Voters were upset over the large budget deficit, high crime rates, and a declining population. Harrison would go on to win serving from 1994 until his death in 1995.

He died in 1998 at the age of 71 due to complications from diabetes.

References

1926 births
1998 deaths
21st-century American politicians
African-American mayors in Michigan
Mayors of Pontiac, Michigan
21st-century African-American politicians
20th-century African-American people